Nicole Saphier (born January 26, 1982) is an American radiologist and the director of breast imaging at Memorial Sloan Kettering (MSK) Monmouth, New Jersey. She is well known for providing her opinions as a contributor on Fox News, Fox Business, and MSNBC.

Biography
Saphier was raised in Scottsdale, Arizona. Her father was an attorney and her mother a licensed counselor who worked with children who were victims of abuse and mental illness. She had a child while in high school, stating, "The decision to have my son at a young age was not based on political or religious beliefs. On the contrary, it was based on emotion and a sense of responsibility. Had this happened decades prior, I may have been forced into an unsafe abortion or hidden away during my pregnancy and my child would have been given away. I am grateful to have had the choice to choose life". She went to medical school in Dominica at the Ross University School of Medicine (class of 2008). She is married to Paul Saphier, an endovascular neurosurgeon, whom she met in medical school; they have two sons together.

Professional life 
After graduating from Ross University School of Medicine in 2008, Saphier completed a five-year radiology residency at Maricopa Integrated Health Systems in Arizona.  Following the residency, Saphier completed an Oncologic Imaging Fellowship at the Mayo Clinic Arizona with special interest in breast imaging.  Saphier is a diplomate of the American Board of Radiology and a member of the Centers for Disease Control and Prevention (CDC)'s Advisory Committee on Breast Cancer in Young Women. She currently resides in New Jersey, where she sits on the executive and legislative committees of the Radiological Society of New Jersey.  She is also part of the advisory committee to the New Jersey Department of Health and Centers for Disease Control and Prevention.

In 2019 she was selected as the Top Radiologist of the Year by the International Association of Top Professionals (IAOTP), a marketing company that claims to "handpick" top professionals from different industries, though it does not disclose its selection methods.

Saphier has been a medical contributor to several television news channels, most notably Fox News Channel as well as discussion and panel TV shows such as Fox & Friends, Outnumbered, Mornings with Maria, and The Five.

Books 
Saphier is the author of the national best-selling book Make America Healthy Again: How Bad Behavior and Big Government Caused a Trillion Dollar Crisis.  In the book, Saphier submits that "by getting healthier, we can reduce the astronomical cost of treatment. We don't need socialized medicine--we need to take better care of ourselves."

She has also written Panic Attack: Playing Politics with Science in the Fight Against COVID-19, claiming that politicians have distorted the science around COVID-19 in order to score points against their opponents.

See also
 Medical journalism
 List of journalists in New York City

References

External links 
 Video of Saphier on ‘Fox and Friends Weekend’ discussing flu cases down significantly this [2020] season
 Video of Saphier on Fox News giving timeline for U.S. COVID-19 vaccine rollout
 Nicole Saphier Website

1982 births
Living people
American radiologists
Women radiologists
Fox News people
MSNBC people
People from Scottsdale, Arizona
American writers
People from New Jersey